Virgichneumon is a genus of wasps belonging to the family Ichneumonidae subfamily Ichneumoninae.

Species
Species within this genus include:

Virgichneumon albilineatus
Virgichneumon albomarginatus
Virgichneumon albosignatus
Virgichneumon atricolor
Virgichneumon callicerus
Virgichneumon digrammus
Virgichneumon distincticornis
Virgichneumon dumeticola
Virgichneumon extremator
Virgichneumon faunus
Virgichneumon inopinatus
Virgichneumon judaicus
Virgichneumon krapinensis
Virgichneumon levicoxa
Virgichneumon maculicauda
Virgichneumon monostagon
Virgichneumon nivaliensis
Virgichneumon seticornutus
Virgichneumon spicicornis
Virgichneumon subcyaneus
Virgichneumon tenuicornis
Virgichneumon tenuipes
Virgichneumon tergenus
Virgichneumon texanus
Virgichneumon zebratus

References

Ichneumoninae